Kevin Falls is an American television writer and producer. He was the creator and showrunner of the NBC television drama Journeyman. He worked as a consulting producer and writer on Shark. He served as an executive producer for the short lived Lyon's Den. He was a co-executive producer for both The West Wing and Sports Night. He won the Emmy Award for Outstanding Drama Series for three consecutive years (2001–2003) for his work on The West Wing. He wrote and executive produced the feature-length TV Movie Eva Adams in 2009 and Franklin & Bash in 2010. In 2014, his Left Coast company was signed with Fox after a stint at Sony.

Filmography

Producer

Writer

References

External links
 

Living people
American television writers
Place of birth missing (living people)
Year of birth missing (living people)
American male television writers
Primetime Emmy Award winners